Carex hakkodensis is a tussock-forming species of perennial sedge in the family Cyperaceae. It is native to parts of Kamchatka Krai, the Kuril Islands and Japan.

See also
List of Carex species

References

hakkodensis
Taxa named by Adrien René Franchet
Plants described in 1895
Flora of Kamchatka Krai
Flora of the Kuril Islands
Flora of Japan